Henry Townshend (1537?–1621), of Cound and Ludlow, Shropshire, was an English politician.

He was a Member (MP) of the Parliament of England for Bridgnorth in 1571 and 1572, and for Ludlow in 1614.

References

1537 births
1621 deaths
Politicians from Ludlow
English MPs 1571
English MPs 1572–1583
English MPs 1614